Juan de Dios Pérez Quijada (born 1 January 1980 in Panama City, Panama) is a Panamanian footballer, who plays as a midfielder for Tauro.

Club career
After starting his career at local side Panama Viejo, Pérez almost spent the rest of his career at Tauro except for a short spell at Sporting '89 and in Brazil with Juventude whom he joined in 2008.

International career
Pérez made his debut for Panama in a January 2007 friendly match against Trinidad and Tobago and has earned a total of 39 caps including an unofficial match against Guyana in 2010, scoring no goals. He represented his country in 5 FIFA World Cup qualification matches and played at the 2007 and 2013 CONCACAF Gold Cups.

His final international was a July 2013 CONCACAF Gold Cup match against Canada.

Honors
Panamá Viejo
ANAPROF: 2000–01

Tauro
ANAPROF: 2003 (A), 2003 (C), 2006 (C), 2007 (A), 2010 (A)

References

External links 

1980 births
Living people
Sportspeople from Panama City
Association football midfielders
Panamanian footballers
Panama international footballers
2007 UNCAF Nations Cup players
2007 CONCACAF Gold Cup players
2013 Copa Centroamericana players
2013 CONCACAF Gold Cup players
Panamá Viejo players
Tauro F.C. players
Sporting San Miguelito players
Esporte Clube Juventude players
Panamanian expatriate footballers
Expatriate footballers in Brazil